The Adam and Minnie Royhl House, located at 203 S. Third St. in Arlington, South Dakota, is a Queen Anne-style house built in 1902.  It was listed on the National Register of Historic Places in 2001.

It was deemed notable as an "excellent example" of a Victorian architecture house.

It has also been known as the Arlington Skandinavien Lutheran Parsonage.

References

Houses on the National Register of Historic Places in South Dakota
Queen Anne architecture in South Dakota
Houses completed in 1902
Kingsbury County, South Dakota